A statue of Rabindranath Tagore was installed in Somerset, New Jersey in 2021.

References

2021 establishments in New Jersey
2021 sculptures
Franklin Township, Somerset County, New Jersey
Monuments and memorials in New Jersey
Outdoor sculptures in New Jersey
Sculptures of men in New Jersey
Statues in New Jersey
Statues of writers